Sir William "Willie" Purves,  (born 27 December 1931) was a Scottish banker until his retirement in 1998. He was the first Group Chairman of HSBC Holdings following the creation of a holding company to act as parent to The Hongkong and Shanghai Banking Corporation and the Midland Bank following the former's acquisition of Midland in 1992.

Biography
Born in Kelso, Scotland, Purves attended Kelso High School before commenced training with The National Bank of Scotland (now The Royal Bank of Scotland) in 1948. This was interrupted by National Service in Korea, during which time he was awarded the Distinguished Service Order (DSO)  – the only National Service officer to have won this honour. He rejoined banking in 1954 and moved to Hong Kong to join The Hongkong and Shanghai Banking Corporation, where he remained for the rest of his working life. In 1986, he became Chairman and CEO of The Hongkong and Shanghai Banking Corporation, and was appointed Chairman in 1991 prior to the formation of HSBC Holdings, and as such oversaw the purchase and integration of Midland Bank. He retired in 1998.

Knighted in 1993 and awarded the Grand Bauhinia Medal by Hong Kong in 1999, he now lives in London and Oxfordshire. He is married to Lady Purves, and has four children and nine grandchildren by his first wife, Diana Purves.

See also
 Sir Willie Purves Quaich, an annual rugby union award

References

1931 births
Living people
Scottish bankers
Scottish expatriates in Hong Kong
Hong Kong chief executives
Chairmen of HSBC
Commanders of the Order of the British Empire
Companions of the Distinguished Service Order
Recipients of the Grand Bauhinia Medal
Scottish military personnel
Members of the Executive Council of Hong Kong
People from Kelso, Scottish Borders
Scottish chairpersons of corporations
People educated at Kelso High School, Scotland
Knights Bachelor
British Army personnel of the Korean War